Drum is a 1976 American film based on the 1962 Kyle Onstott novel of the same name. It was released by United Artists and is a sequel to the film Mandingo, released in 1975. The film stars Warren Oates, Pam Grier, Ken Norton, and was directed by Steve Carver.

Plot
Drum has been born to a white prostitute, who raises him with her black lesbian lover. Drum grows up to be a fighter and is often forced to bare-knuckle-box other slaves to the brink of death for the entertainment of the owners, one of whom is a gay Frenchman named Bernard DeMarigny. DeMarigny wants to sleep with Drum, but his advances are rejected by the slave and DeMarigny vows revenge against Drum. Drum and his friend Blaise are eventually sold to plantation owner Hammond Maxwell, and are both taken to his plantation to work. Regine is purchased by Maxwell as well and is taken to the plantation for his own personal desires as a bedwench.

After arriving at Maxwell's plantation, Regine is set up in the bedroom above Hammond. Augusta Chauvel, Maxwell's fiancé is jealous and has other plans for Regine. Maxwell's daughter Sophie wants to sleep with Drum, but he won't for fear of being killed. Sophie also attempts to sleep with Blaise, and after being rejected, tells her father that Blaise has raped her. Blaise is put in chains and Maxwell decides that he must be castrated for the alleged rape.

Meanwhile, a dinner party has been arranged to celebrate the engagement of Maxwell and Chauvel. DeMarigny has been invited to attend the celebration and the guests end up discussing the best way to castrate a slave at the dinner party. While the party is taking place, Drum frees Blaise from his chains and there ends up being a violent uprising from the slaves at the engagement party. DeMarigny shoots Blaise during the fighting and Drum in turn grabs hold of DeMarigny's privates and rips them off. Both slaves and slavers are killed during the battle, but Maxwell and Chauvel are all saved by Drum. In appreciation for saving his family, Maxwell sets Drum free.

Cast
 Warren Oates as Hammond Maxwell
 Pam Grier as Regine
 Ken Norton as Drum
 Isela Vega as Marianna
 Yaphet Kotto as Blaise
 John Colicos as Bernard DeMarigny
 Fiona Lewis as Augusta Chauvel
 Paula Kelly as Rachel
 Royal Dano as Zeke Montgomery
 Lillian Hayman as Lucretia Borgia
 Rainbeaux Smith as Sophie Maxwell
 Brenda Sykes as Calinda
 Clay Tanner as Mr. Holcomb
 Lila Finn as Mrs. Holcomb

Production

Development
The film was initially being directed by Burt Kennedy, but he was replaced due to creative differences with the executive producer, Dino De Laurentiis. Carver then took over as director with only four days of preparation, the film's print made use of material filmed by both Kennedy and Carver. According to a 2020 interview with Carver, Burt Kennedy had only shot the opening sequence in Puerto Rico. Embarrassed by the script, Kennedy walked off the picture. Carver stated that "a lot of the actors followed him off of the picture". Carver then had to recast several roles and brought on "Pam Grier, Royal Dano and Brenda Sykes and several others".

Release

Home media
A restored edition of Drum has been released on DVD and blu-ray by Kino Lorber (2014), which includes an audio commentary by director Steve Carver.

Reception

Critical response
Vincent Canby of The New York Times wrote: "Life on the old plantation was horrendous, I agree, but movies like this are less interested in information than titillation, which, in turn, reflects contemporary obsessions rather more than historical truths."

References

External links
 
 
 

1976 films
1970s action drama films
1976 LGBT-related films
American sequel films
American action drama films
American LGBT-related films
1970s English-language films
Blaxploitation films
Films based on American novels
Films set in the 19th century
Films set in New Orleans
Films shot in Louisiana
Films about interracial romance
Films about race and ethnicity
Films about racism in the United States
Films about American slavery
United Artists films
Films produced by Dino De Laurentiis
Films directed by Steve Carver
1976 drama films
1970s American films